Omar Khyam is a citizen of the United Kingdom, who led a terrorist plot in May 2007.
He was trained in bomb-making at the Malakand training camp in Pakistan in 2001 or 2002. He was the ringleader of a plot to explode a fertilizer bomb in London. He was moved to HM Prison Full Sutton, near York, in March 2008.

References

British Muslims
Living people
1982 births